Ahmed Hassan (born 18 June 1995) is a Pakistani-born Italian cricketer. In November 2019, he was named in Italy's squad for the Cricket World Cup Challenge League B tournament in Oman. He made his List A debut, for Italy against Hong Kong, on 8 December 2019. In June 2022, he was named in Switzerland's Twenty20 International (T20I) squad for their series against Luxembourg.

References

External links
 

1995 births
Living people
Italian cricketers
Cricketers from Lahore
Pakistani emigrants to Italy